Latte is a coffee drink made with espresso and steamed milk.

The term may also refer to:

People
 Kurt Latte, German philologist and classical scholar

Other uses
 Latte (graphics chip), codename of the TeraScale-based graphics processing unit (GPU) 
 Latte stone, type of pillar found in the Mariana Islands
 Wey Latte, a compact luxury crossover SUV

See also
 Lattes (disambiguation)